Joseph Birchall was a professional English footballer who played as a winger.

References

Year of birth missing
Year of death missing
Association football wingers
Burnley F.C. players
Preston North End F.C. players
English Football League players
English footballers